Luen may refer to:

People
 Raymond Kwok Ping Luen (born 1952)
 See Kok Luen, Malaysian football player
 Yea Luen (born 1950), Hong Kong singer and actor

Places
 Lüen, Switzerland
 Luen Wo Hui, Hong Kong

Other
 Luen Group, Hong Kong organized crime triad

See also
 Lün, Mongolia